After the Wizard is an independent 2011 fantasy film written and directed by Hugh Gross, based on the 1900 novel The Wonderful Wizard of Oz by L. Frank Baum. The film premiered in 2011 in Kingman, Kansas. The DVD, distributed by Breaking Glass Pictures, was released on August 7, 2012.

Premise
A 12-year-old Kansas orphan turns to the Scarecrow and the Tin Woodman for help during a difficult time. She imagines that things have not gone well in Oz since the Wizard left and that the Scarecrow and the Tin Woodman must travel to Kansas to find Dorothy. On the way, they mistake school children for munchkins and must navigate a New York City train terminal, to arrive in Kansas. Meanwhile, the head of the orphanage is exacerbated with the way the girl deals with her loss and emotional trauma.

Cast
 Jordan Van Vranken as Elizabeth Haskins/Dorothy Gale
 Orien Richman as Tin Woodman
 Jermel Nakia as Scarecrow
 Helen Richman as Mrs. Murphy
 Loren Lester as Dr. Edwards
 Peter Mark Richman as Charles Samuel Williams
 Sue Giosa as Ms. Thomson
 P. David Miller as Cowardly Lion
 Molly Bogner as Sassy orphan with second speaking line

Production
The film was shot at various locations in California, Illinois, Kansas, Missouri, New Jersey, and New York.

Award
For her acting in After the Wizard, actress Jordan Van Vranken won a Young Artist Award in the 34th Young Artist Awards for Best Performance in a DVD Film: Young Actress.

References

External links 
 
 
 Home Theater Info review

2011 films
2011 fantasy films
American fantasy films
Films based on The Wizard of Oz
2010s English-language films
2010s American films